Epilepia melapastalis is a species of snout moth in the genus Epilepia. It was described by George Hampson in 1906, and it is known from Réunion, Mozambique, South Africa and Zimbabwe.

References

Epipaschiinae
Lepidoptera of Mozambique
Lepidoptera of South Africa
Lepidoptera of Zimbabwe
Moths of Réunion
Moths of Sub-Saharan Africa
Moths described in 1906